Goreti Venkataiah (born 4 April 1965), better known as Goreti Venkanna, is an Indian poet and singer known for his works in Telugu literature. He became popular after his song "Palle Kanneru Peduthundo" in the film Kubusam. He also acted as a judge for the folk song program Rela Re Rela on Star Maa. In November 2020, Goreti was nominated as a Member of Legislative Council (MLC) in Telangana. In 2021, he won the Sahitya Akademi Award in poetry category for his work Vallanki Taalam.

Early life
Goreti Venkataiah was born on 4 April 1965 in Gowraram village of present-day Nagarkurnool district in Telangana, India to Goreti Narasiah and Eeramam. Most of his childhood was spent in singing the native folk songs describing the lives of peasants and the farmers of Telangana. He is one of the famous singers and lyricists from Telangana.

Goreti completed his postgraduate in MA and worked in Government services. He is married to Anasuya.

Career
Goreti Venkanna is the lyricist for the Telugu movie, Batukamma.

Although, he is not a commercial movie lyricist, he composed songs for various movies. Most popular amongst these is Palle Kanneeru Pedutundo from the movie Kubusam. He also composed a song about the Rayalaseema factionism sung on TV 9 channel a popular news channel. His other works though not limited to, include a song for the movie "Maisamma IPS". His songs are predominantly known for their composition on the Telangana State.

Books
Venkanna's songs are published:

 Eku naadam Motha
 Rela Poothalu
 Alasandra Vanka
 Pusina Punnam
 Vallanki Taalam

Awards
 2006: Kala Ratna or Hamsa Award for Literature from AP State Government
 2016: Kaloji Narayana Rao Award from Telangana State Government.
2021: Sahitya Akademi Award for Vallanki Taalam from Ministry of Culture, Government of India.

Filmography
 Encounter
 Sri Ramulayya
 Kubusam
 Vegu Chukkalu
 Maha Yagnam
 Maisamma IPS
 Bathukamma
 Nagaram Nidra Potunna Vela
 People's War
 Bhandook
 Basthi 
 Bilalpur Police Station
 Annadata Sukhibhava
 Mallesham
 Dorasaani
 Sheesh Mahal

References

External links
 Interview in Telugu
 A blog featuring Goreti Venkanna's songs

Recipients of the Kala Ratna
Telugu poets
Indian male songwriters
People from Telangana
People from Mahbubnagar
Living people
1963 births
Recipients of the Sahitya Akademi Award in Telugu